The Surveying and Spatial Sciences Institute (SSSI) is the professional association for surveyors and spatial science workers, including cartography, hydrography, remote sensing, engineering and mining surveying, photogrammetry and spatial information in Australia. The Institute's members are involved in communities of practice such as land administration, land development, natural resource management, forestry, agriculture, defence, marine environment, local government, health, education, transport, tourism, and many more. The institute deals with policy, administration, collection, measurement, analysis, interpretation, portrayal and dissemination of spatially- related land and sea information, together with associated planning, design and management.

SSSI is located in eight different regions across Australia, providing services in the six states and two territories. The institute's headquarters are located at National Surveyors House in Canberra, Australia.

Background

The spatial sciences range from the traditional practices of surveying and cartography to the more recent practices using GPS, remote sensing and GIS. The spatial sciences involve the skills and understanding to capture, store, manage, manipulate, analyse, model, visualise, set-out and govern information that can be referenced to location.

Information that can be related to a location is termed spatial information. Though predominantly perceived as geo (earth) related, spatial information can range from the anatomic to astronomic scale, from the real to the abstract entity, over any time period.

SSSI acquire, integrate, manage, analyse, interpret, map or distribute information about a location in space and time. They develop, design, and provide related equipment, software and value-added services; undertake applied research, knowledge management and technology development; and manage, educate and train others.

The spatial information industry is new, emerging, growing and a major player in the development of the nation's economy. The spatial information industry brings sophisticated skills and technology to major challenges facing the nation. It is the recognition of the strategic importance of the industry for policy, planning and operational activities which touch on all aspects of the way people and communities live, that is driving governments around the world to invest in the skilling of the workforce and the development of policies that will ensure the viability and growth of the industry (Cane Report).

Objectives 
The institute's purpose & objectives are to empower members to strive for excellence in both, application and practice of surveying and spatial science. This is supported by promoting and representing professional interests of members that work in the discipline of surveying & spatial science. Additionally, the institute also facilitates the exchange of ideas and knowledge between members of the institute via lectures and conferences.

In short, the institute provides with the following benefits to its members:

 Advocacy 
 Events 
 Professional Development 
 Certification 
 Migration Skill Assessment

History

The Spatial Sciences Institute (SSI) represents the interests of the spatial information community within the Asia-Pacific region. The Spatial Sciences Institute (SSI) is a not-for-profit professional body  with headquarters in Canberra, Australia. Its membership spans the disciplines of surveying, information technology, town planning, cartography, archeology, spatial information (GPS, remote sensing and GIS) professions and others. 

In 1952, six State Institutes combined to form Institute of Surveyors Australia (ISA), the result of more than seventy years of intermittent effort.

Institute of Surveyors Australia (ISA), Australian Urban and Regional Information Systems Association (AURISA) and Remote Sensing and Photogrammetry Association of Australia (RSPAA) amalgamated to form SSI in 2003.

The SSI merged with the Institute of Surveyors Australia (ISA) to form the Surveying and Spatial Sciences Institute (SSSI) in 2009. ISA provides a strong history while SSI comprises a large youth base, a strong driving factor for ISA with the merger. The primary reason for the merger is to create a strong, unified voice for the surveying and spatial profession with an ability to better serve its members.

In 2009, SSSI participated in Q150 (the 150th anniversary of the founding of Queensland) by placing permanent memorials to early explorer/surveyors of Queensland at significant locations. They include a memorial to surveyor to Francis Peter MacCabe at the Calliope River Historical Village 

The current name, "Surveying and Spatial Sciences Institute", has been chosen by a democratic process which gave all members of both SSI and ISA a vote in choosing the name.  Initially, a call for suggested names was distributed with over 200 names proposed. A two stage vote was held with a short list of four names offered after the first round of voting and a substantial majority selecting the final name. Over 1200 members participated in both stages of the vote evenly spread across both SSI and ISA memberships.

Leadership

Past Presidents

Board Members 
The Board of management of the Institute are responsible for the governance, strategic planning, fiduciary oversight and monitoring against the strategic plan.

The members of the Board of Directors are 
 The President 
 The President-Elect
 Six Regional Directors 
 Director of the Hydrography commission
 Chair of the Young Professionals Special Interest Group

Consultative Council handles membership, professional development, certification and service delivery.

Commissions 
Membership of the institution are divided into Commissions, with the first ones being

 Land Surveying;
 Hydrography;
 Engineering and Mining Surveying;
 Spatial Information and Cartography and
 Remote Sensing and Photogrammetry

The role of a Commission Committee is to formulate and discuss policy for the Commission and to advice the Directors on matters relating to the Commission.

Membership 
Membership categories are necessary in a professional institute to differentiate between differing levels of qualification and experience. Movement through the membership occurs via an articulation process which involves satisfying the prescribed progression and professional certification criteria.

Membership Categories

 Honorary Fellows
 Fellows
 Member
 Associate member
 Affiliate
 First year graduate
 Second year graduate
 Part time student
 Overseas Membership
 Student

Special Interest Groups 
Special Interest Groups are based on specific grouping of members of the Institute. A representative from these groups are invited by Directors to participate at any meeting, Committee, Council or Board of the institute.

Young Professionals 

The Young Professionals are members of the institute who are under 36 years old. Their role within the Institute is to foster member and growth of the institute through service delivery to young surveying and spatial professionals; representation of young surveying and spatial professional in the Institute; provision of leadership to young professionals within the profession; and the engendering of the community awareness of the surveying and spatial sciences and the Institute.

There is a Young Professionals regional committee within each state, and these committees work with the broader regional committees of each region as well as the commissions to deliver events, opportunities and networking for members.

Women in Spatial 
This special interest group, is based on a grouping of members on a specific topic or subject. Most regions hold special events for women in surveying & spatial sciences to encourage women to engage and develop skills.

Other efforts

Certification 
SSSI offers a certification program to enable members and non-members to gain recognition of their competencies through a formal “portfolio-based” process. Certifications are available for general competencies and specialist competencies including spatial information, hydrographic surveying, remote sensing, and engineering surveying.

Migration Skill Assessment 
The Institute carries out an authorised assessment of skills and qualifications for migration to Australia.  Only Surveyor ANZSCO 232212 general skilled occupation can be assessed by SSSI.

Events & Awards 
The Institute conducts various events & awards for its members to facilitate knowledge sharing and networking.

LOCATE : A geo-spatial conference which is conducted annually
APSEA: The Asia Pacific Spatial Excellence Awards are conducted to celebrate achievement of top spatial and surveying professionals
SEASC: South East Asia Survey Congress is a surveying event that will be conducted for the first time at Darwin, Australia in 2019
E-CPD : A webinar which is accessible by SSSI members.

Publications 

The official publication of SSSI is POSITION which is published once in two months. It is an Australian magazine of surveying, mapping and geo-information while Geo-message is a monthly newsletter.

The Journal of Spatial Science is an academic journal owned jointly by SSSI and Mapping Sciences Institute, Australia. This journal publishes original peer-reviewed research and review papers that contribute to the theory and practice of the survey and spatial sciences. The Journal also publishes professional papers that describe aspects of professional practise and implementation of techniques related to cartography, geodesy, geographic information science, hydrography, photogrammetry, remote sensing or surveying.

Partners

National 

 The Institution of Surveyors NSW - represents land surveying, and engineering and mining surveying professionals in New South Wales
 Surveyors Board of South Australia represents land surveying, and engineering and mining surveying professionals in South Australia
 The Mapping Sciences Institute Australia is a learned society established to engender the professional development of individuals and organisations involved in the many facets of the mapping sciences

International 

 The Urban and Regional Information Systems Association (URISA) is a multidisciplinary association. The Association for GIS Professionals, URISA is a leading provider of learning and knowledge for the GIS community
 The Chartered Institution of Civil Engineering Surveyors (ICES) is an international qualifying body dedicated to the regulation, education and training of surveyors working within civil engineering
 The International Federation of Surveyors (FIG) is an international, non-government organisation whose purpose is to support international collaboration for the progress of surveying in all fields and applications
 The Australasian Hydrographic Society is the South West Pacific and South East Asian regional focus for those interested in hydrography and related sciences

See also
ANZLIC
Surveying in Australia

References

External links
 
 

Professional associations based in Australia
Surveying organizations
Geographic societies
Geodesy organizations
Geomatics organizations
Remote sensing organizations
Photogrammetry organizations